Gevim (lit. Cisterns) is a kibbutz in southern Israel. Located in the northwestern Negev desert near Sderot, it falls under the jurisdiction of Sha'ar HaNegev Regional Council.

History
The kibbutz was established in 1947 under the name Sde Akiva. The founding members were from the Palmach and had previously been members of HaNoar HaOved VeHaLomed. It served as a headquarters for the Israel Defense Forces during the 1948 Arab-Israeli War, and was later renamed Gevim.

During the 2000s, the kibbutz suffered from the repeating Qassam rocket attacks, with damage to buildings and minor injuries to residents. Based on an interview with the community manager of the kibbutz, the Goldstone Report on the Gaza conflict stated that sixty percent of the kibbutz children received psychological counselling.

Economy
In addition to agriculture, the kibbutz has a plastics factory. Poleg Plastic Industries operates two plants, one on the kibbutz and the other in Leipzig, Germany. The company is jointly owned by Kibbutz Gevim and Poli-Film Group, a private German company.

The kibbutz is located near Sha'ar HaNegev school and Sapir Academic College.

References

Kibbutzim
Kibbutz Movement
Populated places established in 1947
Gaza envelope
1947 establishments in Mandatory Palestine
Populated places in Southern District (Israel)